The Boston Strangler is a 1968 American biographical crime film loosely based on the true story of the Boston Strangler and the 1966 book by Gerold Frank.  It was directed by Richard Fleischer and stars Tony Curtis as Albert DeSalvo, the strangler, and Henry Fonda as John S. Bottomly, the chief detective who came to fame for obtaining DeSalvo's confession. Curtis was nominated for a Golden Globe Award for his performance. The cast also featured George Kennedy, Murray Hamilton and Sally Kellerman.

Plot
After three murders of elderly women, the victims being strangled and penetrated with foreign objects, the Boston police conclude that they have a serial killer to catch. As the murders stretch over several police jurisdictions, Massachusetts Attorney General Edward W. Brooke appoints John S. Bottomly as head of a "Strangler Bureau" to coordinate the investigation. Several suspects are interrogated and released.

As the body count grows, Bottomly, in desperation, calls in a psychic, Peter Hurkos, who pinpoints Eugene T. O'Rourke, a man who seems to fit the profile. The severely masochistic O'Rourke is taken in for psychiatric observation for ten days but nothing implicated him to the murders. Another murder is committed while O'Rourke is under observation, clearing him of suspicion.

While the 1963 funeral of John F. Kennedy is on television, Albert DeSalvo leaves his wife and children, under the pretext of work. He gains entry into the apartment of a woman, Dianne Cluny, by posing as a plumber sent by the building supervisor. He attacks her, tying her to her bed with rags ripped from her dress. DeSalvo is taken aback by the sight of himself in a mirror as he tries to subdue Dianne and she struggles free and bites his hand; DeSalvo flees.

He tries to enter the apartment of another woman, only to find that her husband is home. DeSalvo is apprehended by a passing police patrol. Found incompetent to stand trial for attempted breaking and entering, he is committed to a hospital for psychiatric observation. By chance, Bottomly and Detective Phil DiNatale pass by DeSalvo in an elevator, where they had been visiting Dianne, who survived the earlier attack. Observing the wound on DeSalvo's hand (Dianne, who survived his attack, could remember biting him but not his appearance), the pair make him a suspect for the Boston Strangler murders.

Conventional interrogation is ineffective because the treating physician thinks that DeSalvo suffers from a split personality: he has two identities that are unaware of each other. His "normal" personality fabricates memories in place of the memories of murder committed by the "strangler" personality. The treating physician thinks that DeSalvo could be made to confront the facts but that the shock risks putting him in a catatonic state. Bottomly expresses the opinion that catatonia would be the second-best thing to a conviction.

Under the condition, imposed by DeSalvo's defense counsel, that none of what comes to light is admissible evidence in court, Bottomly is allowed a final round of interviews with DeSalvo. After several sessions, Bottomly manages to reveal DeSalvo's hidden personality to himself. Reeling from the shock, DeSalvo slips into a catatonic state.

Cast

Production
Film rights to Frank's book were bought for $250,000 (equivalent to $ million in ). Terence Rattigan was hired to do the script but the producer was unhappy with it. Edward Anhalt was then brought in.

Many individuals and agencies in Boston were unsupportive of the film’s production. “Boston Police Commissioner Edward McNamara insists it would be highly improper to cooperate with the filmmakers in a story about murder rampage which hasn’t been officially resolved….[Producer] Fryer asked for permission to use Boston policecars. The answer was no. A letter from Commissioner McNamara also made it plain that police personnel would not be authorized to work as extras on the film, a practice that had been approved in two other pictures that went on location in Boston last year. Another request to bring cameras into police headquarters for one scene was deleted. Fryer couldn’t even get permission to take still photos of the offices of the attorney general and the local police commissioner so that they could at least be reproduced back at the studio in Hollywood. Not a soul was willing to cooperate, not even local hospitals. One scene required Fonda to walk out of a hospital….'We asked for permission at two hospitals, Massachusetts General and Beth Israel,' Fryer complained, 'Both turned us down'.”

Box office
According to Fox records the film required $8,625,000 in rentals to break even and by 11 December 1970 had made $11,125,000 so made a profit to the studio.

Critical response

Film critic Roger Ebert gave three stars out of four but criticized the film's content,

In the same vein, The New York Times film critic Renata Adler wrote,

In 2004, film critic Dennis Schwartz discussed the film's style,

Accolades

 Golden Globe Award Nomination: Best Motion Picture Actor - Drama, Tony Curtis; 1969.
 Edgar Award: Edgar Allan Poe Award Nomination, Best Motion Picture Screenplay, Edward Anhalt; 1969.
 American Cinema Editors: Eddie, Best Edited Feature Film, Marion Rothman; 1969.

See also
 List of American films of 1968

References

External links
 
 
 
 
 
 
 The Boston Strangler at DVD Beaver (includes images)

]

1968 films
1960s biographical films
1968 crime drama films
1960s serial killer films
20th Century Fox films
American biographical drama films
American crime drama films
American neo-noir films
American serial killer films
Biographical films about serial killers
Crime films based on actual events
Cultural depictions of Albert DeSalvo
American docudrama films
Films directed by Richard Fleischer
Films scored by Lionel Newman
Films set in 1963
Films set in 1964
Films set in Boston
Films shot in Massachusetts
Films with screenplays by Edward Anhalt
1960s English-language films
1960s American films